Bisha Domestic Airport is an airport serving Bisha, in 'Asir Province, Saudi Arabia. It opened on 1 June 1976.

Facilities

Airlines and destinations

See also 

 Arar Domestic Airport
 List of airports in Saudi Arabia
 Saudia

References

External links
 
 
 

1976 establishments in Saudi Arabia
Airports established in 1976
Airports in Saudi Arabia
'Asir Province